Trivellona bulla is a species of small sea snail, a marine gastropod mollusk in the family Triviidae, the false cowries or trivias.

Description
The length of the shell attains 0.8 mm.

Distribution
This species occurs in the Coral Sea and off New Caledonia.

References

 Fehse D. & Grego J. (2004) Contribution to the knowledge of the Triviidae (Mollusca: Gastropoda). IX. Revision of the genus Trivellona. Berlin and Banska Bystrica. Published as a CD in 2004; as a book in 2009

Triviidae
Gastropods described in 2001